Steve, Steven or Stephen Sutton may refer to:

Steve Sutton (rugby union) (born 1958), Welsh rugby union player
Steve Sutton (footballer) (born 1961), English footballer
Steve Sutton (skydiver), Canadian skydiver
Stephen Sutton (1994–2014), British charity campaigner
Stephen John Sutton (born 1964), Australian man imprisoned in Argentina for drug trafficking